Karl Max is one of the two major roads in the Indian city of Vijayawada, Andhra Pradesh, the other being M.G Road. Karl Max Road runs from the old bus depot to a city named Eluru in West Godavari district. MG Road diverges into Bandar Road and Karl max Road near the police control room in Governorpeta. This road runs generally parallel to the Ryves Canal and joins NH5 at Ramavarappadu Ring at the city's official limits.

Roads in Vijayawada